Steve Young (January 6, 1953 – January 9, 2003) was national president of the Fraternal Order of Police in 2001.

Early life
Born Kermit Steven Young on January 26, 1953, in Upper Sandusky, Ohio. He was a Lieutenant with the Marion Police Department in Marion, Ohio.

Career
Young started both his FOP and police careers in 1976 with the Marion Police Department. He served as the state FOP president from 1988 to 1999 and was elected national president in 2001, when he received unanimous support after he ran unopposed.

Young also served on state and national committees, including President George W. Bush's Homeland Security Committee to which he was appointed in 2002.

He was inducted into the Department of Labor Hall of Honor in 2003.

Death
Young died of cancer on January 9, 2003, at the age of 50.

References

External links
US Dept of Labor Hall of Honor Inductee, Steve Young
Steve Young - 2003 FOP Co-Member of the Year
Steve Young Memorial Lodge #24
President George W. Bush's Statement on Steve Young
Statement from FBI Director Robert S. Mueller on the Death of Steve Young, National President of the Fraternal Order of Police
STATEMENT OF THE ATTORNEY GENERAL REGARDING STEVE YOUNG, NATIONAL PRESIDENT OF THE FRATERNAL ORDER OF POLICE
STATEMENT OF ATTORNEY GENERAL JOHN ASHCROFT REGARDING INDUCTION OF FRATERNAL ORDER OF POLICE PAST PRESIDENT STEVE YOUNG INTO LABOR HALL OF FAME
Steve Young Memorial Scholarship Program

1953 births
2003 deaths
American trade union leaders
American police officers
Deaths from cancer in Ohio
People from Marion, Ohio
People from Upper Sandusky, Ohio
Place of death missing
Activists from Ohio